Ethnic conflicts involving the Fulani people (also known as Fula) occur in West Africa, primarily in Nigeria, but also in Mali, Cameroon, the Democratic Republic of Congo, and the Central African Republic, due to conflicts over land and culture. The death count for each attack is small, although the cumulative death count is in the thousands.

History

Conflict between farmers and herders 
The Fulani are largely nomadic/semi-nomadic and live in the semi-arid climate of West Africa. Due to population growth and desertification, Fulani nomads have to move south towards more fertile lands to graze their herds. This created conflicts with the farmers. This resulting violence left a death toll of over 10,000.

This violence is always interpreted in Nigeria through cultural and religious lenses. The Fulani herdsmen are seen by those who don't know them as almost exclusively Muslims, while the farmers in Middle belt are almost all Christians. However the true picture is the herdsmen only care about their animals as the conflict occur even between them and the Hausa farmers. Both sides suffer in what either party terms as ethnic cleansing.

Attacks

Nigeria 

Nigeria experienced the most attacks. In 2018, approximately 1,930 Christians died from Fulani attacks there.

These attacks are typically carried out with firearms, although bombs and kidnapping are also used. They mostly target private property followed by government buildings, businesses and religious institutions.

Mali 
Fulani extremism has had much influence in Mali. In 2012, the Malian government was overthrown by Amadou Sanogo. Although tension between the Christian south and the Muslim north was already present, the coup weakened the country and allowed terrorism to rise.

Several Fulani extremist groups have risen in Mali. The Macina Liberation Front (FLM) formed in 2015, and committed 29 attacks with at least 129 casualties. Another group is the National Alliance for the Protection of Fulani Identity and the Restoration of Justice (ANSIPRJ). This group carried out one attack in 2016 that killed 17 and injured 35.

Malian Fulani extremist groups target state facilities rather than private property. A majority of the attacks are done with firearms.

Efforts to reduce this conflict were aided by France, Mali's former colonizer, which sent military aid and assistance. The aid was largely to counter the rise in terror. The United States supported France in this effort. The United Nations sent peacekeeping troops to Mali. However, the peacekeeping troops became a target.

Central African Republic 
As of April 2019, fourteen attacks had occurred in the Central African Republic. The main target was private property. The weapon of choice is a firearm.

Democratic Republic of Congo 
As of April 2019, one attack had occurred in the Democratic Republic of Congo. On March 26, 2016, Fulani extremists attacked a military base in Ngaliema. The attackers injured a soldier but cost them three of their own men.

Cameroon 
In February 2020, Fulani extremists carried out the Ngarbuh massacre alongside Cameroonian soldiers during the Anglophone Crisis.

References

Fulani herdsmen attacks
Human rights in Africa